Pasquiaornis is a prehistoric flightless bird genus from the Late Cretaceous. It lived during the late Cenomanian, between 95 and 93 million years ago in North America.

Two species have been described, P. hardiei and P. tankei. The genus Pasquiaornis was a member of the Hesperornithes, flightless toothed seabirds of the Cretaceous. Though its relationships to other members of this group are inadequately known, Pasquiaornis appears to have been one of the more basal lineages.

References

Bird genera
Late Cretaceous birds of North America
Hesperornitheans
Extinct flightless birds